Shuguang (曙光) may refer to:

Shuguang (spacecraft), a proposed Chinese crewed spacecraft that was never built
Sugon or Shuguang, Chinese supercomputer manufacturer
SG Automotive or Shuguang Automotive, a Chinese vehicle and component manufacturer
Break Free (TV series), a 2013 Malaysian-Singaporean TV series

Places in China
Heilongjiang
Shuguang Township, Heilongjiang, a township in Keshan County
Shuguang Subdistrict, Daxing'anling, a subdistrict in Jiagedaqi District, Daxing'anling Prefecture
Shuguang Subdistrict, Yichun, a subdistrict in Cuiluan District, Yichun

Jilin
Shuguang, Meihekou, a town in Meihekou
Shuguang Subdistrict, Changchun, a subdistrict in Nanguan District, Changchun

Liaoning
Shuguang, Liaoyang, a town in Liaoyang
Shuguang Subdistrict, Anshan, a subdistrict in Lishan District, Anshan
Shuguang Subdistrict, Panjin, a subdistrict in Xinglongtai District, Panjin

Other provinces
Shuguang Subdistrict, Beijing, a subdistrict in Haidian District, Beijing
Shuguang, Guizhou, a town in Nayong County, Guizhou
Shuguang Township, Inner Mongolia, a township in Bayannur, Inner Mongolia
Shuguang Township, Sichuan, a township in Santai County, Sichuan
Shuguang Township, Yunnan, a township in Guangnan County, Yunnan